Gideon Patt (22 February 1933 – 26 April 2020) was an Israeli politician who served in several ministerial positions between the late 1970s and early 1990s.

Biography
Born in Jerusalem during the Mandate era, Patt served in the Nahal brigade and studied economics at New York University, gaining a BA.

For the 1969 elections he was placed 27th on the Gahal list, but missed out on a seat when the alliance won only 26 seats. However, he entered the Knesset on 29 January 1970 as a replacement for the deceased Aryeh Ben-Eliezer. He was re-elected in 1973 and 1977 and was appointed Minister of Housing and Construction in Menachem Begin's government. In January 1979, he switched to the Industry, Trade and Tourism portfolio.

Following the 1981 elections the Tourism and Industry and Trade portfolios were separated, though Patt continued to hold both until August 1981 when he gave up the Tourism post.

After the 1984 elections he became Minister of Science and Development, before returning to the Tourism portfolio after the 1988 elections. Although he retained his seat in the 1992 elections, the government was formed by Labor, and Patt lost his place in the cabinet. He did not run for re-election in 1996 and retired from politics.

Patt died on 26 April 2020.

References

External links
 

1933 births
2020 deaths
Israeli economists
Israeli Jews
Jewish Israeli politicians
Jews in Mandatory Palestine
Gahal politicians
Likud politicians
Members of the 7th Knesset (1969–1974)
Members of the 8th Knesset (1974–1977)
Members of the 9th Knesset (1977–1981)
Members of the 10th Knesset (1981–1984)
Members of the 11th Knesset (1984–1988)
Members of the 12th Knesset (1988–1992)
Members of the 13th Knesset (1992–1996)
Ministers of Housing of Israel
Ministers of Science of Israel
Ministers of Tourism of Israel
New York University alumni
People from Jerusalem